Sakari is a given name, and may refer to:

 Sakari Kukko (born 1953), Finnish saxophonist and flutist
 Sakari Kuosmanen (born 1956), Finnish singer and actor
 Sakari Oramo (born 1965), Finnish conductor
 Sakari Pinomäki, Finnish mechanical and hydraulic systems engineer
 Sakari Timonen (born 1957), Finnish blogger
 Sakari Tuomioja (1911-1964), Finnish politician
 Yrjö Sakari Yrjö-Koskinen (1830-1903), freiherr, senator, professor, historian, and politician

See also
Sakari (village), India
Sakari Station
Sakari were chosen guard of the Pharaoh

Finnish masculine given names